A binary asteroid is a system of two asteroids orbiting their common barycenter. The binary nature of 243 Ida was discovered when the Galileo spacecraft flew by the asteroid in 1993. Since then numerous binary asteroids and several triple asteroids have been detected.

The mass ratio of the two components – called the "primary" and "secondary" of a binary system – is an important characteristic. Most binary asteroids have a large mass ratio, i.e. a relatively small satellite in orbit around the main component. Systems with a small minor-planet moon – also called "companion" or simply "satellite" – include 87 Sylvia, 107 Camilla, 45 Eugenia, 121 Hermione, 130 Elektra, 22 Kalliope, 283 Emma, 379 Huenna, 243 Ida and 4337 Arecibo (in order of decreasing primary size). Some binary systems have a mass ratio near unity, i.e., two components of similar mass. They include 90 Antiope,  and 69230 Hermes, with average component diameters of 86, 1.8, 0.9 and 0.8 km, respectively.

Description 

Several theories have been posited to explain the formation of binary-asteroid systems. Many systems have significant macro-porosity (a "rubble-pile" interior). The satellites orbiting large main-belt asteroids such as 22 Kalliope, 45 Eugenia or 87 Sylvia may have formed by disruption of a parent body after impact or fission after an oblique impact. Trans-Neptunian binaries may have formed during the formation of the Solar System by mutual capture or three-body interaction. Near-Earth asteroids, which orbit in the inner part of the Solar System, most likely form by spin-up and mass shedding, likely as a result of the YORP effect. Numerical simulations suggest that when solar energy spins a “rubble pile” asteroid to a sufficiently fast rate by the YORP effect, material is thrown from the asteroid's equator. This process also exposes fresh material at the poles of the asteroid.

Gallery

See also 
 
 
 Contact binary (small Solar System body)
 Triple asteroids  and

References